Walter Frederick Truettner (July 24, 1881 – 1967) was a member of the Michigan Senate.

Truettner was born in Dundas, Wisconsin. He died in Grayling, Michigan.

Career
Truettner served in the Senate from 1923 to 1928. He was also a member of the Michigan Republican State Committee.

He was president of the Bessemer National Bank until 1927, later becoming vice-president of the National Bank of Detroit, and from 1947 to 1955 he held the presidency of the Grayling Bank.

References

External links

People from Calumet County, Wisconsin
Republican Party Michigan state senators
1881 births
1967 deaths
20th-century American politicians
People from Grayling, Michigan